Tolatecan is a proposal by Campbell and Oltrogge (1980) linking two language families of Mesoamerica, Tequistlatecan (Chontal of Oaxaca) and Tol/Jicaque languages of Honduras. It does not have good support (Campbell 1997).

References
 Campbell, Lyle. (1997). American Indian Languages, The Historical Linguistics of Native America. Oxford Studies in Anthropological Linguistics. Oxford: Oxford UP.
 Campbell, Lyle, and David Oltrogge (1980). "Proto-Tol (Jicaque)." International Journal of American Linguistics, 46:205-223

Proposed language families
Indigenous languages of North America